Never Say Never World Tour was the second concert tour by American R&B singer Brandy to support her second studio album, Never Say Never. The tour became Norwood's first world tour, reaching North America, Asia,  and Europe. The tour began in Paris, France, on May 23, 1999; However the American leg of the tour concluded earlier than expected on July 6th due to Brandy's obligations of filming Moesha. 

Her showcase in Illinois on July 7th was also taped, and aired later that year in December on UPN, entitled "Brandy in Concert: A Special for the Holidays". The June 10th show at the Shibuya Public Hall in Tokyo, Japan; was filmed and aired exclusively on WOWOW. The special was titled, "Brandy: Live in Japan 1999".

Crew
Keyboard: Eric Daniels, Stan Jones
Percussion: Ebenezer DaSilva
Bass: Ethan Farmer
Drums: Jaime Gamble
Guitar: Glenn McKinney
Backing vocals: Gromyko Collins, Demetrice O’Neal
Dancers: Denosh Bennett, Edwin Morales, Leticia Roman, Lamar Tribble, Robert Vinson, Lejon Walker, Earl Wright, Russel Wright
Tour Manager: Fred Kharazi
Production Manager: Mike Carter
Lighting Director: John Labbriola
Drum Tech: John Lopez
Hair & Makeup: Kanika Morgan
FOH Sound Engineer: Elliot Peters
Programmer: Steve Lu
Monitor Engineer: Mike Mule
Wardrobe: Barbie Baptist

Opening act
Tyrese (North America, select dates)
Silk (North America, select dates)
C-Note (North America, select dates)	
702 (North America, select dates)

Setlist
"Overture" (contains elements of "Never Say Never")
"Happy"
"Baby"
"I Wanna Be Down"
"Sittin' Up in My Room"
"Angel in Disguise"
"U Don't Know Me (Like U Used To)"
"Have You Ever?"
"Almost Doesn't Count"
"Never Say Never"
"Top of The World"
"The Boy Is Mine"
"(Everything I Do) I Do It for You"

Tour dates

Festivals and other miscellaneous performances
This concert was a part of "Summerfest"

Cancellations and rescheduled shows

References

1999 concert tours
Brandy Norwood concert tours